Penwiper is a common name that can refer to a number of plant species in different nations.

In Britain and Africa it usually refers to Kalanchoe marmorata.

In New Zealand it usually refers to one of the species of alpine plants of the genus Notothlapsi - usually Notothlapsi rosulatum.

The name refers to the layered, dark-blotched leaves, which appear ink-spattered like penwipers, cloth blotting papers used to clean the nibs of early ink pens.

Gallery

References

Kalanchoe